Angelo Bencivenga (born 25 July 1991) is an Italian footballer who plays as a right midfielder for Santarcangelo.

Career
Bencivenga returned to Italy in January 2009 for Udinese in January 2009, from Swiss side La Chaux-de-Fonds.

In summer 2011, Bencivenga was signed by Parma F.C. on free transfer, but joined Simone Malatesta at Pro Vercelli in a co-ownership soon after, for €500. On 22 June 2012, Parma became full owners of the player again, but also formed a new temporary deal for Bencivenga. On 31 January 2013 he joined Ternana.

References

External links

1991 births
Living people
Italian footballers
U.S. Livorno 1915 players
Parma Calcio 1913 players
F.C. Lumezzane V.G.Z. A.S.D. players
F.C. Pro Vercelli 1892 players
Ternana Calcio players
U.S. Lecce players
Como 1907 players
Serie B players
Association football midfielders